McCrea Furnace is an unincorporated community near Mahoning Creek Dam in Wayne Township, Armstrong County, Pennsylvania, United States.

References

Unincorporated communities in Armstrong County, Pennsylvania
Unincorporated communities in Pennsylvania